Cyrtodactylus (Greek κυρτος kurtos "curved", from κυπτω kuptō "to stoop"; δακτυλος daktulos "finger, toe") is a diverse genus of Asian geckos, commonly known as bent-toed geckos, bow-fingered geckos, and forest geckos. The genus has about 300 described species as of 2020, which makes it the largest of all gecko genera. As of 2023, Cyrtodactylus santana is the last known species in its family.

Description
Instead of possessing dilated digits like other geckos, members of Cyrtodactylus have slender, curved toes to which the common names for the genus can be attributed.

Taxonomy
The phylogenetic relationships with this genus and the genus Geckoella has not been resolved to date. All species of Geckoella have been placed here pending a more definitive study.

Phylogeny
The following phylogeny is from Pyron, et al. (2013), and includes 22 Cyrtodactylus species. Cyrtodactylus is a sister group of Hemidactylus.

Species
The genus Cyrtodactylus contains about 300 described species. In 2019, six new species of the Cyrtodactylus intermedius complex were identified in the Cardamom Mountains and Associated Highlands region of Southeast Asia.

References

Further reading

 (Cyrtodactylus, new genus, p. 56).

External links
Diversification of Bent-toed Geckos (Cyrtodactylus) on Sumatra and west Java

 
Lizard genera
Taxa named by John Edward Gray